Raoudha Chaari (born 4 February 1973) is a Tunisian judoka. She competed in the women's lightweight event at the 1996 Summer Olympics.

References

1973 births
Living people
Tunisian female judoka
Olympic judoka of Tunisia
Judoka at the 1996 Summer Olympics
Place of birth missing (living people)
Mediterranean Games bronze medalists for Tunisia
Mediterranean Games medalists in judo
Competitors at the 1997 Mediterranean Games
20th-century Tunisian women
21st-century Tunisian women
African Games medalists in judo
Competitors at the 1995 All-Africa Games
African Games silver medalists for Tunisia